"Sofia" is a song by American singer Clairo. Fader Label released it as the third single from her debut studio album Immunity on July 26, 2019. The song was written by Clairo and Rostam Batmanglij, who also produced the song, and features drums from Danielle Haim. "Sofia" became a sleeper hit after going viral on the video-sharing platform TikTok, charting on the Billboard Hot 100 more than a year after its initial release.

Background and composition
Musically, "Sofia" is a Eurodisco, dance-rock, and soft rock song, with a pulsating electropop beat. In a Facebook post, Clairo explained that "Sofia" was inspired by her first experiences having crushes on older women whom she saw in the media. She named Sofia Vergara and Sofia Coppola as examples, and claimed that writing "Sofia" was her way of celebrating her discovery whilst "maintaining the cheesy/corny lyrics you'd normally find in songs where you profess your love". She continued by writing that the song "captures a moment in [her] life but instead of hiding it, it's expressed in an almost 'explosive' manner".

Critical reception
Carolyn Droke of Uproxx described the song as an "anthem for the actualization of [Clairo's] sexuality", saying that the lyrics and rhythm "encapsulate feelings of exhilaration and trepidation at the threshold of a new relationship". Harry Todd of Paste compared the production of the song to that of The Strokes and Sleigh Bells, with its "heavily processed guitars and crunchy drums". He continued to praise producer Batmanglij for "peppering [the song] with arpeggiated synths and vocoder melodies that recall Daft Punk's lovelorn slow-burns", and Clairo for "selling" the song with her vocal performance. Katherine St. Asaph of Pitchfork compared the synths in "Sofia" to that of "Dancing on My Own" by Robyn.

Credits and personnel
Credits adapted from Tidal.

 Claire Cottrill – songwriter
 Rostam Batmanglij – producer, songwriter, recording engineer
 Danielle Haim – drums
 Emily Lazar – mastering engineer
 Chris Allgood – mastering engineer
 Dave Fridmann – mixer
 Cary Singer – recording engineer
 Nate Head – recording engineer
 Dalton Ricks – recording engineer
 Michael Harris – recording engineer

Charts

Weekly charts

Year-end charts

Certifications

References

2019 songs
2019 singles
Clairo songs
LGBT-related songs
Songs written by Rostam Batmanglij
Songs written by Clairo